The following is a list of symbols of the U.S. state of Montana.

State symbols

See also
List of Montana-related topics
Lists of United States state insignia
State of Montana

References

External links
Symbols of Montana

Montana
State symbols